Brkić is a  surname borne by Bosniaks, Croats and Serbs. Notable people with the surname include:

 Ante Brkić (born 1988), Croatian chess player
 Boško Brkić (1968-1993), Romeo of Sarajevo killed by sniper fire during siege of Sarajevo
Courtney Angela Brkic (born 1972), Croatian-American memoirist, short story writer, and academic
Goran Brkić (born 1991), Serbian footballer
Haris Brkić (1974-2000), Yugoslav basketball player
Hasan Brkić (1913–1965), Yugoslav and Bosnian communist and partisan
Hrvoje Brkić, (born 1983), Croatian biophysicist
Ivan Brkić (disambiguation), several people
Jozo Brkić (born 1986), Bosnian-Herzegovinian basketball player
Marijan Brkić Brk (born 1962), Croatian guitarist
Marko Brkić (basketball) (born 1982), Serbian basketball player
Marko Brkić (footballer) (born 2000), Bosnian footballer
Milija Brkić (born 1954), Serbian footballer
Mladen Brkić (born 1980), Serbian football player
Nikola Brkić (born 1998), Montenegrin water polo player
Senad Brkić (born 1969), Bosnian footballer
Tomislav Brkić (born 1990), Bosnian-Herzegovinian tennis player
Vasilije Jovanović-Brkić (1719-1772), Serbian metropolitan of Dabar and Bosnia
Željko Brkić (born 1986), Serbian football goalkeeper
Zvonko Brkić (1912–1977), Croatian politician

See also 

 Brkich

Bosnian surnames
Croatian surnames
Serbian surnames
Patronymic surnames